Joseph Wing Farm Complex is a historic home and farm complex located at Duanesburg in Schenectady County, New York. The farmhouse was built about 1820 and is a -story, five-bay frame building on a limestone foundation in a vernacular Federal style. It has a gable roof, is sheathed in clapboard, and has a -story rear wing.  Also on the property are four contributing barns and three sheds.

The property was covered in a 1984 study of Duanesburg historical resources.
It was listed on the National Register of Historic Places in 1984.

References

Houses on the National Register of Historic Places in New York (state)
Houses in Schenectady County, New York
Federal architecture in New York (state)
Houses completed in 1820
National Register of Historic Places in Schenectady County, New York